Malkoçoğlu Cem Sultan is a Turkish historical action film by Remzi Aydın Jöntürk. It is one of the numerous collaborations between the famous actor Cüneyt Arkın and Jöntürk. The film belongs to the wave of historical films in the Turkish cinema. The film is about the beloved comics character of Ayhan Başoğlu, Malkoçoğlu. The film was shot simultaneously in Turkish and in Persian. The Iranian version  was released as Serzemin-e Delaveran in 1971.

The main features of the movie has real historical basis as Malkoçoğlu was regarded as one of the loyal Akıncı families of the Ottoman Empire. The film is the dramatization of Başoğlu's comic book of the same name and tells the story of the life struggle of Cem Sultan and how Akıncıs help him. The leader of the Akıncı troops, Malkoçoğlu, trusts a peasant, Polat, and accepts him into his army and gives him the mission to safely guide Cem Sultan to his Frenk allies. Cüneyt Arkın portrays two characters in the film, as a part of his trademark style.

Plot

Cast 
 Cüneyt Arkın ... Polat / Malkoçoğlu or Ali as Polat's father (Dual role)
 Gülnaz Huri ... Melek
 Cihangir Ghaffari ... Cem Sultan
 Feri Cansel ... Jitan
 Suzan Avcı ... Zühre
 Behçet Nacar ... Gaddar("brutal") Hamolka
 Özdemir Han ... Şeytan("Devil") Omerro
 Ayton Sert ... Hancı("accommodator") İgor
 Aytekin Akkaya ... Raider
 Günay Güner ... Raider
 Adnan Mersinli ... Öküz Abdi
 Tarık Şimşek ... Omerro's henchman

Political aspect of the film
Illustrating the class differences in society during the mid-Ottoman era is one of the key elements of the film. Poor peasant Polat has to kill a wealthy landlord because he tries to take Polat's lover away from him by stating that a peasant even doesn't have the right to talk to such an influential person. This depiction is a classic of Remzi Jöntürk films, even for the action based ones, frequently emphasizing on class struggles in society. The film also has references to the medieval understanding of honor and how it was, in some cases, more significant than state affairs.

References

External links
 

1960s Turkish-language films
Films set in Turkey
Turkish action films
Turkish historical adventure films
Films based on Turkish comics
Live-action films based on comics
1969 films
Turkish sequel films
Films shot in Turkey
Turkish swashbuckler films
Turkish films about revenge
1960s action films
Films set in the Ottoman Empire
1960s historical adventure films
Historical action films
1960s multilingual films
Iranian multilingual films
Turkish multilingual films
Persian-language films
Iranian historical films
Iranian adventure films